Frank Washington (4 April 1921 - 24 January 2013) was an American basketball player. He was born and raised in Germantown and graduated from Germantown High School.

Washington was a 6'4" guard from Wilberforce, Ohio. Before joining the US Navy, he played one season for the New York Rens from 1941 to 1942 .

In 1945, he played for the Washington Bears. Washington was part of the first Harlem Globetrotters team to travel around the world. Washington was a member of the Harlem Globetrotters from 1946 to 1960.

After his basketball career, he joined Pepsi-Cola, working in advertising, then sales, and rising to the position of community relations manager.

His daughter Michelle Washington was also a basketball player. Washington died on 24 Jan 2013 at Thomas Jefferson University Hospital at the age of 91.

References

1921 births
2013 deaths
Basketball players from Ohio
Harlem Globetrotters players
New York Renaissance players
People from Wilberforce, Ohio
American men's basketball players
20th-century African-American sportspeople
21st-century African-American people
United States Navy personnel of World War II